Vilius Armanavičius (born 8 May 1995) is a Lithuanian football player. He plays for Caspiy Aktau in the Kazakhstan Premier League.

International career
He made his debut for the Lithuania national football team on 12 October 2021 in a World Cup qualifier against Switzerland.

References

External links
 
 

1995 births
Sportspeople from Kaunas
Living people
Lithuanian footballers
Lithuania youth international footballers
Lithuania under-21 international footballers
Lithuania international footballers
Association football midfielders
FC Stumbras players
FK Jonava players
FK Atlantas players
FC Hegelmann players
FC Caspiy players
A Lyga players
Lithuanian expatriate footballers
Lithuanian expatriate sportspeople in Kazakhstan
Expatriate footballers in Kazakhstan